Reginald John Kerr (born October 16, 1957) is a Canadian retired professional ice hockey player. He played in the National Hockey League with the Cleveland Barons, Chicago Black Hawks, and Edmonton Oilers between 1977 and 1984.

Playing career
Born in Oxbow, Saskatchewan, Kerr was drafted in the third round, 41st overall in the 1977 NHL Amateur Draft by the Cleveland Barons, but only played seven games for the Barons before he was traded to the Chicago Black Hawks for Randy Holt. Kerr spent five seasons with the Black Hawks and scored a career-high 30 goals and 30 assists during the 1980-81 season. He left in 1982 and spent a season in the American Hockey League for the Springfield Indians before signing with the Edmonton Oilers, but he was assigned back to the AHL with the Moncton Alpines and played just three games for the Oilers. Kerr departed at the end of the season and retired.

In total, Kerr played 263 NHL games, scoring 66 goals and 94 assists for 160 points.

Post-playing career
Kerr now lives in the Chicago area, and is President of R.J.Kerr, Inc., an office furniture company. He is also the vice president of the Blackhawk Alumni Association. In 2016, he and his wife, Teresa, sold their home in Northfield, Illinois.

Career statistics

Regular season and playoffs

Awards
 WCHL First All-Star Team – 1977

References

External links
 

1957 births
Living people
Canadian ice hockey left wingers
Chicago Blackhawks players
Cleveland Barons (NHL) draft picks
Cleveland Barons (NHL) players
Edmonton Oilers players
Houston Aeros draft picks
Ice hockey people from Saskatchewan
Kamloops Chiefs players
Moncton Alpines (AHL) players
People from Oxbow, Saskatchewan
Phoenix Roadrunners (CHL) players
Springfield Indians players